Simone Schilder (born 7 April 1967) is a former Dutch tennis player. She won a total of two singles and eight doubles ITF titles in her career. On 4 July 1988, she reached a singles ranking high of world No. 164. On 14 August 1989, she peaked at No. 71 in the doubles rankings.

At the age of 17, Schilder became the 1984 French Open girls' doubles champion and represented the Netherlands at the 1984 Summer Olympics.

WTA career finals

Doubles: 2 (2 runner-ups)

ITF finals

Singles (2–0)

Doubles (8–9)

See also
 List of French Open champions

External links
 
 
 

1967 births
Living people
Sportspeople from Beverwijk
Dutch female tennis players
French Open junior champions
Grand Slam (tennis) champions in girls' doubles
Olympic tennis players of the Netherlands
Tennis players at the 1984 Summer Olympics